Constituency W-318 is a reserved Constituency for female in the Provincial Assembly of Punjab.

General elections 2013

General elections 2008

See also

 Punjab, Pakistan

References

External links
 Election commission Pakistan's official website
 Awazoday.com 
 Official Website of Government of Punjab

Provincial constituencies of Punjab, Pakistan